Stomopteryx maledicta is a moth of the family Gelechiidae. It was described by Edward Meyrick in 1921. It is found on Java in Indonesia.

The wingspan is about 9 mm. The forewings are dark grey speckled with grey whitish throughout. The plical stigma is cloudy, obscurely darker, sometimes preceded and followed by slight whitish suffusion. The hindwings are grey.

References

Moths described in 1921
Stomopteryx